The Central District of Zarandieh County is a district (bakhsh) in Zarandieh County, Markazi Province, Iran. At the 2006 census, its population was 48,274, in 12,448 families.  The District has four cities: Mamuniyeh, Zaviyeh, Khoshkrud and Parandak. The District has three rural districts (dehestan): Hakimabad Rural District, Khoshkrud Rural District, and Rudshur Rural District.

References 

Zarandieh County
Districts of Markazi Province